Mazowe District is the southernmost of seven districts of Mashonaland Central province in Zimbabwe. The district capital is the village of Mazowe.

References

 
Districts of Mashonaland Central Province